The U.S. Senate Agriculture Subcommittee on Conservation, Climate, Forestry, and Natural Resources is one of five subcommittees of the U.S. Senate Committee on Agriculture, Nutrition and Forestry. Prior to the 117th Congress, it was named the Subcommittee on Conservation, Forestry and Natural Resources.

This subcommittee has jurisdiction over rural development legislation and rural electrification legislation, oversight of rural electrification, agricultural credit, the Farm Credit System, the Farm Credit Administration, and the Farmers Home Administration and its successor agencies. It also has jurisdiction over crop insurance, forestry in general and forest reserves that were acquired from state, local, or private sources, soil conservation, stream channelization, and watershed and flood control programs involving structures of less than  storage capacity.

The subcommittee was renamed for the 112th Congress (2011). It was formerly named the Subcommittee on Rural Revitalization, Conservation, Forestry and Credit Jurisdiction.

Members, 118th Congress

External links
Committee website, Subcommittee page

Agriculture Forestry, Conservation, and Rural Revitalization